Proud is a surname. Notable people with the surname include:

Albert Proud (born 1988), Australian rules football player
Andrew Proud (born 1954), Anglican Bishop 
Bill Proud (1919–1961), English cricketer
David Proud (born 1983), English actor born with spina bifida
Geoffrey Proud (born 1946), Australian painter
George Proud (born 1939), Canadian politician
Peter Proud (1913–1989), British art director
Ted Proud (born 1930), British postal historian and philatelic writer

English-language surnames